Quentin Cooper (born 1961, Grimsby) is a science journalist and facilitator, who presented BBC Radio 4's Material World from 2000 to 2013. He speaks at science festivals and lectures, and works regularly with science and educational organisations such as the Royal Society and the British Council.

Early life
Cooper attended Wintringham school in Grimsby, studied for a BSc in psychology and artificial intelligence at the University of Edinburgh and obtained a Postgraduate Diploma in Journalism Studies at University College Cardiff.

Career

Broadcasting

At BBC Radio Scotland, in Glasgow, Cooper worked as a producer in News and Current Affairs, and youth programmes such as Bite the Wax, presented by Armando Iannucci, then Hit The North which first united Mark and Lard aka Mark Radcliffe and Marc Riley for Radio 5 in Manchester. 
 
Moving to London he produced arts programmes, and presented Kaleidoscope, and a range of arts, entertainment, technology and science programmes across Radio 1, 2, 3, 4, 5Live and World Service. He was a film critic for 5Live then for Radio 2's Parkinson's Sunday Supplement. Cooper presented the series Science Fix for BBC Four and New Scientist Reports for Discovery Channel.

From 1999 to 2013 he presented Material World on Radio 4.   Described by the Radio Times as "the most accessible, funny and conversational science programme on radio" and by Bill Bryson as "quite the best thing on radio", in the 2011 BBC Trust review of impartiality and accuracy of the BBC's coverage of science it was singled out for "particular praise".

Cooper is an occasional presenter of the BBC World Service discussion programme The Forum, and interviewer on the Transplant Links Community podcast.

Science communication
An advisor to many national and international science organisations and festivals and host of numerous recurring and one-off events and conferences, in 2011 he was given an Honorary Degree of Doctor of Science by Heriot-Watt University, in 2012 he was the first radio presenter to be made an Honorary Fellow of the Royal Society of Chemistry, and in 2013 the University of Edinburgh awarded him an Honorary Degree of Doctor of Science in recognition of his "major contribution to the public understanding of science and engineering".

Publications
In October 1994, he co-wrote  Maypoles, Martyrs, and Mayhem: 366 days of British customs, myths and eccentricities with Paul Sullivan, an almanac of British customs, myths and beliefs across the year, described by The Times as a "'A perfectly conceived compendium of culture' It was serialised by the Sunday Express

Cooper occasionally writes for national newspapers, and has been a columnist for publications including the Fortean Times, the Radio Times and the now defunct international BBC site BBC Future

Personal life
On 26 September 2009, he married Suba Subramaniam at St Dunstan's church in Monks Risborough, Buckinghamshire. She is a choreographer and artistic director of Sadhana Dance, as well as an education director for Cape Farewell, UK, an organisation which brings together artists, scientists and schoolchildren to help explore and tackle problems relating to climate change.

References

External links
 BBC Radio 4's Material World (with audio archive of programmes)
 Connect
 Connect archive
 Article by Quentin Cooper on Cape Farewell
 
 His father
 BBC Trust Review

Video clips
 Presenting at the 2007 Cheltenham Festival of Science

News items
 His wedding in September 2009

1961 births
Alumni of the University of Edinburgh
English radio personalities
People from Grimsby
British science journalists
Living people
BBC Radio 4 presenters